Wallpaper (stylized as Wallpaper.) is an American hip hop and pop music project, fronted by producer, multi-instrumentalist, and songwriter Eric Frederic (better known as Ricky Reed) based in Oakland, California. Wallpaper is signed to Boardwalk Records/Epic Records and has played at SXSW. The band is known for their lyrics, which Frederic has characterized as satire of pop music and consumer culture, as well as for their early use of exaggerated auto-tune.

History
In 2005, Eric Frederic began experimenting with music that emphasized the effects of auto-tune, an approach which was, at the time, still relatively uncommon. Frederic named this solo project Wallpaper, and developed the alter-ego of Ricky Reed as Wallpaper's lead singer; Reed was described as rude, reckless, and irresponsible, and was intended to personify everything Frederic disliked about the contemporary pop music industry.

As exaggerated auto-tune became more prevalent in the mainstream, Wallpaper's songs gained popularity, and their debut album DooDoo Face was released in 2009 through Eenie Meenie Records. By 2010, Wallpaper had begun to transition away from the focus on auto-tune, and added drummer Arjun Singh as an official member of the band. In December, the duo released the EP #STUPiDFACEDD, co-distributed by MTV's Hype Music and Boardwalk Records, followed by a music video for the single of the same name, described as "a brash, stupid party anthem to mock all brash, stupid party anthems."

In 2011, Wallpaper toured with K.Flay and Too Short, and appeared at the MTV Video Music Awards. Later that year, the band toured with Awolnation, then with Gym Class Heroes and Dirty Heads, closing the tour at The Grove in Anaheim, California. By this time, Frederic had fully adopted the name Ricky Reed in a professional capacity, and was no longer referred to by his real name in interviews and press releases. Despite this, he had long since abandoned the idea of staying "in character" as Reed outside of Wallpaper's lyrics.

Wallpaper signed to Epic Records in 2012 and expanded their lineup once more, this time to include vocalist Novena Carmel and percussionists Derek Taylor and Tom Peyton. Their performance at Coachella in April received acclaim, with critics comparing it favorably to "boa constrictor-era" Britney Spears. Following an appearance at South by Southwest, Wallpaper appeared on Jimmy Kimmel Live! and Last Call with Carson Daly Tonight to perform "#STUPiDFACEDD," as well as the single "[Fucking] Best Song Everrr".

In 2013, Wallpaper released their second full-length album, entitled Ricky Reed Is Real, to mostly positive reviews from fans and critics. The following year, the band covered the theme song to the television series 21 Jump Street for the film adaptation of the same name.

Throughout Wallpaper's career, Frederic occasionally produced music for other artists (such as "Anyway" by Cee-Lo Green) and Wallpaper collectively shares a producer credit on Far East Movement's single "The Illest". As of 2021, all social media accounts for Wallpaper have been removed or deleted excluding their YouTube account, which has not received an update since 2014. Frederic appears to be focusing his efforts on producing for other artists and his progressive indie rock band, Facing New York.

Discography

Albums

Extended plays

Singles

Promotional singles

References 

Year of birth missing (living people)
Living people
American record producers
Musicians from Oakland, California
Singer-songwriters from California